Dietes grandiflora, the large wild iris, African iris or fairy iris, is a rhizomatous perennial plant of the family Iridaceae with long, rigid, sword-like green leaves. This species is common in horticulture in its native South Africa, where it is often used in public gardens, beautification of commercial premises and along roadsides.

The blooms are white marked with yellow and violet. Dark markings are found at the base of the outer tepals. These are borne in abundance during summer, especially after rain. These flowers will last a couple of days and are then followed by 5 cm long green capsules that contain very dark brown seeds, dispersed when the capsule splits open.

Cultivation
Plants prefer dappled shade to full sun where they will flower in profusion, though they will grow in shaded areas (with an accompanying loss of flower production). Under favourable conditions, the clumps multiply rapidly. Dietes grandiflora are drought and frost hardy, making them popular for en masse plantings.

Environmental weed
Dietes grandiflora is considered an "environmental weed" in parts of Australia, particularly Western Australia, Queensland, and Lord Howe Island.

References

Iridaceae
Garden plants of Southern Africa
Flora of Southern Africa
Plants described in 1928
Taxa named by N. E. Brown